Lentvaris Manor is a former residential manor in Lentvaris, Trakai District Municipality, Lithuania.

Founded in the 16th century, the manor homestead stands on the northern shore of Lake Lentvaris, which was artificially created by pouring an embankment over the lake.

Lentvaris manor is registered in the Register of Cultural Values and is a state protected object, it must also be taken care of by the Department of Cultural Heritage.

Buildings 

 19th century Neo-Gothic palace built in 1861-1869. (architect G. von Schacht), reconstructed in 1899. according to the project of the Belgian architect de Vego and the architect T. Rostvorowski; 
 Servants Quarters', built at the end of the 19th century; 
 Brick-style barn (early 19th century); 
 Stables (late 19th - early 20th century); 
 English Park, founded in the 19th century. end, landscape architect Édouard André.

History 
The manor has been mentioned since 1596.

In the 18th Century, the town of Lentvaris, was within the territory of the Polish–Lithuanian Commonwealth. It was populated by Poles, Lithuanians and Jews and belonged to the estate of the Polish-Lithuanian House of Sapieha. In the 17th c. the owner of the manor was Tomasz Sapieha.

Following the partitions of the Polish-Lithuanian Commonwealth the town became part of the Russian Empire.In 1850 the estate was bought from Izdebski by Count Józef Tyszkiewicz (1835-1891). In 1885 he had a Tudor-style palace built on the northern shore of Lake Lentvaris, which was widened during 1850-1873; a causeway connected the estate, which was surrounded on three sides by water, with the town. 
The manor house was built in two stages. In 1865-1866 it was led by Gustav Shachn. The manor house was a two or three-storey building with a wide entrance porch façade, a tall tower on the southwest side, and on the other side had a lower, two-storey wing. It faced the lake. It was in Józef Tyszkiewicz’s time that almost all the farm buildings were built as well.

Józef also planted a large park next to it, designed by the well-known French landscape architect Édouard André: local and foreign trees (larch, gray walnut, silver and Swedler maples, etc.) predominated.

In 1891  Władysław Tyszkiewicz (1865-1936), who inherited the manor, reconstructed the palace, later it acquired the current appearance of English Gothic.

The author of the reconstruction was architect Tadeusz Maria Rostworowski.

The last owner of the manor in 1936. Count  Stefan Eugeniusz Tyszkiewicz (1894-1976) became the manor, who ruled the manor until 1939.

Since 1957 the administration of Lentvaris Carpet Factory (now AB Kilimai and UAB Lentvario Kilimai) was located in the manor.

In 2007 the manor was bought by businessman Laimutis Pinkevičius, who went bankrupt in the same year.

In 2016 businessman Ugnius Kiguolis bought the manor from the auction house.

In 2018, the Lentvaris manor house received 673 thousand European Union support for the reconstruction of part of the building.

References

Manor houses in Lithuania